Jakov or Yaakov Mrvica (14 October 1978 11 May 2004) was an Israeli-Serbian military person and a sergeant in the Israeli Defense Forces (IDF).

Biography 
He was born on 14 October 1978 in Zemun, a suburb of Belgrade, then SR Serbia and SFR Yugoslavia, as Željko Mrvica. His father worked in the merchant navy, while his mother Ružica is of Serbian-Jewish descent, and was an architect. He lost his father as a ten-year-old, so he moved with his mother and sister to Novi Sad, where he finished coaching school and was actively involved in various sports, from rowing, basketball, diving, hiking, boxing to judo. He won awards at national and federal judo competitions. He served his military service in the Armed Forces of Yugoslavia and was stationed in Bačka Topola.

His mother's Jewish heritage influenced him to move to Israel in February 2002. He first worked as a judo coach and used that time to learn Hebrew, in order to join the Israeli Defense Forces (IDF).

He became a member of the IDF, was given the rank of sergeant and joined the Givati Brigade. In the army, he met his girlfriend, with whom he planned a marriage and family after leaving the military service.

He was killed in the Zeitoun neighborhood of Gaza on 11 May 2004 when his combat vehicle hit a landmine planted by Hamas members. He was buried on 20 May 2004 at the Jewish cemetery in Novi Sad, at the request of his family. His coffin was covered with the flag of Israel, and his funeral was attended by representatives of the Israeli Embassy in Serbia and Montenegro, a delegation of the Israeli Defense Forces and two colonels of the Armed Forces of Serbia and Montenegro.

In October 2004, Jakov Mrvica was planning to go the United Kingdom, where he would raise money for a non-profit organization that takes care of Israeli soldiers without families and provides them with accommodation.

Monument and Memory 

His girlfriend designed and led a project to erect a monument to Jakov in Israel. The monument was made in the shape of the Star of David as a symbol of Jakov Mrvica's connection with Israel and the Jewish people, and it was made of Jerusalem stone, which indicates the love he had for Jerusalem. Pieces of black iron symbolize the horrors of war. Members of the Israeli Defense Forces are visiting this monument as a replacement for his grave in Israel. They visit the monument twice a year - on Yom HaZikaron, as well as on the anniversary of his death.

In 2012 movie was made about him

References 

1978 births
People from Zemun
People from Novi Sad
Israeli people of Serbian-Jewish descent
Serbian Jews
Jewish military personnel
Israeli military personnel killed in action
2004 deaths
Landmine victims